Anne Yelsey (born August 28, 1985) is a former American professional tennis player.

She has numerous ITF Women's Circuit titles. Her career high ranking is number 370 achieved on 18 August 2008. Her career high doubles ranking is 278th achieved on the 28 July 2008.

Yelsey took part in the 2007 Bank of the West Classic Doubles tournament partnering Amber Liu but lost in the first round to Katarina Srebotnik and Ai Sugiyama. She has taken part in many other ITF and WTA Tour events.

ITF Circuit finals

Singles 3 (1–2)

Doubles: 6 (4–2)

References
 
 
 

1985 births
Living people
American female tennis players
21st-century American women